Exaeretia conciliatella is a moth of the family Depressariidae. It is found in Greece and on Sicily and the Canary Islands.

The wingspan is 20–22 mm.

References

Moths described in 1892
Exaeretia
Moths of Europe
Moths of Africa